Jean Paul Kürsteiner (July 8, 1864 in Catskill, New York – March 19, 1943 in Los Angeles, California) was an American pianist, pedagogue, music publisher, and composer of piano pieces and art songs.

Life and musical career
Kürsteiner was the son of a French-Swiss father (August Kürsteiner) and an American mother (Jeannie Taylor Woodruff Kürsteiner).  His early education was in New York, then he studied music in Leipzig, including composition with Salomon Jadassohn and Richard Hofmann and piano with Johannes Wiedenbach and Robert Teichmüller.  He returned to the United States in 1893, settled in New York City and was appointed to the piano and music theory faculty of the Ogontz School for Girls in Philadelphia.  He held that position until 1930.  Between 1896 and 1906 he also created, developed, and directed a program of piano study at The Baldwin School in Bryn Mawr, Pennsylvania.

Kürsteiner founded a music publishing house in New York called Kürsteiner & Rice, and published much of his own music there.  The "silent" partner in the firm may have been the operatic tenor Leon Louis Rice. The singer was known to have performed Kürsteiner's songs on tour, and some of the songs were written for or dedicated to him.

On July 21, 1901, in  Eau Claire, Wisconsin, Kürsteiner married Myrta French, an operatic soprano.  In 1938 the Kursteiners moved to Los Angeles, California, where he lived the last years of his life.

Musical works
Kürsteiner composed music in 33 opus numbers for piano solo and art songs for voice and piano in the years between 1910 and 1930.  His song Invocation to Eros became fairly well known in its day. For example, it was performed by the American soprano Rosa Ponselle on a concert at Hill Auditorium at the University of Michigan on October 28, 1928.  Twelve years earlier, on November 7, 1916, the New York Times review of contralto Frances Ingram at Aeolian Hall in New York praised for her performances of both Kürsteiner's “Invocation to Eros” and “The Soul’s Victory”.

He is also known to have composed and published choral music.  An advertisement in the American Guild of Organists journal The American Organist, Volume, 2, no. 1, January 1920, p. A-4, lists “New Choruses for solo, quartet or chorus, with added solos, duos, trios, and contrasting solo quartet sections." The ad also claims that the choruses are "Intense in Devotional Spirit; adapted to all Creeds—Episcopal, Christian Science, Jewish Synagogues, Baptists, etc., of genuine Melodic Beauty. Letters from Coast to Coast indicate their worth as helps to divine worship".  A quote from Musical America Magazine praises one anthem as “One of the most conspicuous numbers of devotional music by a contemporary composer that we know”.

Published Songs
Opus, Title, Publisher, Publication date
12/1 I would my song were like a Star; G. Schirmer, 1910
12/2 How very Near; G. Schirmer, 1910
12/3 Lines of a Flame; G. Schirmer, 1910
13/1 Song of Life; Kürsteiner & Rice, 1911
13/2 Canticle of Love; Kürsteiner & Rice, 1911
13/3 Invocation to Eros (text by Edith A. Pusey); Kürsteiner & Rice, 1911
14/1 Leave Me Not Yet, O Love; Kürsteiner & Rice, 1911
14/2 Love, My Queen; Kürsteiner & Rice, 1911?
14/3 Night from the Dark World; Kürsteiner & Rice, 1911?
14/4 That One Refrain; Kürsteiner & Rice, 1911
14/5 Rose of the World; Kürsteiner & Rice, 1911
15/1 Morning; Kürsteiner & Rice, 1911?
15/2 Of A’ the Airts the Wind can Blaw; Kürsteiner & Rice, 1911?
15/3 The Betrothal; Kürsteiner & Rice, 1911?
16/1 Awake, My Love; Kürsteiner & Rice, 1911?
16/2 His Lullaby; Kürsteiner & Rice, 1911?
17/1 My Heart Sings as the Birds Sing; Kürsteiner & Rice, 1911
17/2 O Breath of the Golden Day (text by James B. Kenyon); Kürsteiner & Rice, 1912
19 Three Night Songs (text by Martin Schütze); Kürsteiner & Rice, 1912
20/1 If I Were a Raindrop; Kürsteiner & Rice, 1912
20/2 Only a Day for Tears; Kürsteiner & Rice, 1913
24/2 The Salutation of the Dawn (text translated from the Sanskrit); Kürsteiner & Rice, 1915
24/3 The Soul’s Victory (Dramatic); Kürsteiner & Rice, 1916
24/4 Nightfall (Lyric Song); Kürsteiner & Rice, 1916
25/1 Supplication (Religious-Dramatic); Kürsteiner & Rice, 1916
25/2 Hope (Religious-Dramatic); Kürsteiner & Rice, 1916
25/3 Deliverance (Religious-Dramatic); Kürsteiner & Rice, 1916
25/4 Triumphans (Religious-Dramatic); Kürsteiner & Rice, 1917
26/1 Penitence; publisher unknown, nd
26/2 Promise; publisher unknown, nd
26/3 Praise (Lyric-Sacred); Kürsteiner & Rice, 1918
26/4 The Message; publisher unknown, nd
12/4 Serenade; G. Schirmer, 1910

Published Piano Solos
Second Nocturne for Piano; G. Schirmer, 1910
Dreams of Myrta; Ladies’ Home Journal magazine, 1910
Bridal Morning Waltz; Ladies’ Home Journal magazine, nd
Second Nocture for piano; G. Schirmer/Boston Music Co., 1910
Third Nocturne in A flat; Kürsteiner & Rice, 1911
22/1 La Turquoise Valse in C; unknown publisher, nd
Mazourka de Concert; unknown publisher, nd
Etude de Concert; unknown publisher, nd
Etude Melodique for left hand; unknown publisher, nd
Appassionato in D minor; unknown publisher, nd

Published Choral works

25/1a Supplication; publisher unknown, nd
25/2a Hope; Kürsteiner & Rice, 1919
25/3a Deliverance; Kürsteiner & Rice, 1919
26/2a Promise; publisher unknown, nd
26/3a Praise; Kürsteiner & Rice, 1919

Educational Publications
Essays on Expert Aid to Artistic Piano Playing, Unz and Co. publisher, New York, 1910s
12 articles on "Artistic Piano Playing" in The Foyer of Philadelphia

Footnotes

References
.
.
.
.
.

External links
http://ums.aadl.org/ums/programs_19281010e Rosa Ponselle at Hill Auditorium, Ann Arbor Michigan
https://timesmachine.nytimes.com/timesmachine/1916/11/07/104694131.pdf Review of a concert including Kürsteiner's songs
https://books.google.com/books?id=UZRhAAAAIAAJ&pg=PP9&lpg=PP9&dq=Jean+Paul+K%C3%BCrsteiner&source=bl&ots=UV8bE8rK30&sig=oK7X9shQOpXGZVFE1QuH7_Pt2iw&hl=en&ei=FNakS_WHMpOXtgehrqD0CQ&sa=X&oi=book_result&ct=result&resnum=9&ved=0CBoQ6AEwCDgK#v=onepage&q=&f=false   Advertisement in the American Guild of Organists magazine, 1920
http://www.philsp.com/homeville/fmi/t851.htm#A18612 Contents of The Ladies’ Home Journal, v. 27 #8, July 1910

1864 births
1943 deaths
20th-century classical composers
American male classical composers
American classical composers
People from Catskill, New York
Pupils of Salomon Jadassohn
20th-century American composers
20th-century American male musicians